Bohdan Andriyovych Dukhota (born 18 August 2001) is a Ukrainian professional footballer who plays as a right midfielder for Ukrainian First League club Dinaz Vyshhorod, on loan from Kolos Kovalivka.

References

External links
 
 

2001 births
Living people
Sportspeople from Kyiv Oblast
Ukrainian footballers
Ukraine youth international footballers
Association football midfielders
FC Shakhtar Donetsk players
FC Kolos Kovalivka players
FC Dinaz Vyshhorod players
Ukrainian First League players
Ukrainian Second League players